James Arnold Macrae (born February 24, 1926, date of death not found) was a Canadian football player who played for the Edmonton Eskimos. He was later a lawyer, graduating with a law degree from the University of Alberta in 1950 where he played for the University of Alberta Golden Bears with future Premier Peter Lougheed.

References

1926 births
Year of death missing
Canadian lawyers
University of Alberta Faculty of Law alumni